Petr Klimentievich Badlo (born 24 May 1976) is a Ukrainian football manager and former footballer.

Career

Playing career

At the age of 16, Badlo debuted for Ukrainian third tier side Dnister (Zalishchyky). Before the second half of 1994–95, he signed for Krystal (Chortkiv) in the Ukrainian second tier. In 1996, Badlo signed for Ukrainian third tier club Pokuttia, where he made 14 league appearances and scored 2 goals.

In 1998, he signed for Nyva (Ternopil) in the Ukrainian top flight. Before the 1999 season, Badlo signed for Kazakhstani team Tobol. Before the 2007 season, he signed for Aktobe in the Kazakhstani top flight, helping them win 3 consecutive league titles. In 2016, he returned to Ukrainian fourth tier outfit Nyva (Ternopil).

Managerial career

In 2015, Badlo was appointed manager of Nyva (Ternopil) in the Ukrainian second tier. In 2017, he was appointed manager of Ukrainian third tier side Ternopil. In 2022, he was appointed manager of Aktobe in the Kazakhstani top flight.

References

External links

 

1976 births
Association football defenders
Expatriate football managers in Kazakhstan
Expatriate footballers in Kazakhstan
FC Aktobe managers
FC Aktobe players
FC Dnister Zalishchyky players
FC Krystal Chortkiv players
FC Nyva Ternopil managers
FC Nyva Ternopil players
FC Pokuttia Kolomyia players
FC Ternopil managers
FC Tobol players
Kazakhstan Premier League players
Living people
Sportspeople from Ternopil
Ukrainian Amateur Football Championship players
Ukrainian expatriate football managers
Ukrainian expatriate footballers
Ukrainian expatriate sportspeople in Kazakhstan
Ukrainian First League players
Ukrainian First League managers
Ukrainian football managers
Ukrainian footballers
Ukrainian Second League players